Manfred Rulffs (6 March 1935 – 15 January 2007) was a German rower who competed for the United Team of Germany in the 1960 Summer Olympics.

He was born in Kiel and died in Ratzeburg.

In 1960, he was a crew member of the West German boat that won the gold medal in the eights event.

External links
 

1935 births
2007 deaths
Olympic rowers of the United Team of Germany
Rowers at the 1960 Summer Olympics
Olympic gold medalists for the United Team of Germany
Olympic medalists in rowing
West German male rowers
Medalists at the 1960 Summer Olympics
Sportspeople from Kiel
European Rowing Championships medalists